List of women writers (A–L)
 List of women writers (M–Z)

See also

Feminist literary criticism
Feminist science fiction
Feminist theory
Gender in science fiction
List of biographical dictionaries of female writers
List of early-modern British women novelists
List of early-modern British women playwrights
List of early-modern British women poets
List of female detective/mystery writers
List of female poets
List of women cookbook writers
List of women electronic writers
Lists of women writers by nationality
List of feminist literature
List of female rhetoricians
List of women hymn writers
Norton Anthology of Literature by Women
Women in science fiction
Women Writers Project
Women's writing in English
Sophie (digital lib)

External links
A Celebration of Women Writers
SAWNET: The South Asian Women's NETwork Bookshelf
Victorian Women Writers Project
Voices from the Gaps: Women Artists & Writers of Color
The Women Writers Archive: Early Modern Women Writers Online
SOPHIE: a digital library of works by German-speaking women
REBRA: a list of women writers from Brazil. Biographies in Portuguese, English and in Spanish

Women and the arts